Plectochitina is an extinct genus of chitinozoans. It was described by Fritz H. Cramer in 1964.

Species
 Plectochitina magna (Nestor, 1982)
 Plectochitina nodifera (Nestor, 1980)
 Plectochitina obuti Nestor, 1994
 Plectochitina pachyderma (Laufeld, 1974)
 Plectochitina ralphi Nestor, 1994
 Plectochitina spongiosa (Achab, 1977)

References

Prehistoric marine animals
Fossil taxa described in 1964